Julia Elisabeth Boland (born 26 November 1985) is an Australian professional golfer. She graduated to the LPGA Tour after finishing 8th in the 2012 Symetra Tour.

Early life and amateur career 
Boland was born in Tamworth, New South Wales and is the youngest of four children. She studied at the University of Sydney while playing for the NSW team and the Australian Amateur team. She won the 2009 Australian Women's Amateur Stroke Play Championship. After winning the Karrie Webb Series she joined the Texas A&M Aggies. She played a lone season in College Station and recorded three victories for the Aggies. She was an All-Big 12 selection and was named Newcomer of the Year in 2010. In her rookie season on the Symetra Tour in 2012, she won the Four Winds Invitational in August and finished eighth on the money list to earn her LPGA Tour card for 2013.

In March 2018, Boland was elected as President of the ALPG (Australia Ladies Professional Golf)

Professional wins

Symetra Tour wins
2012 Four Winds Invitational

Team appearances
Amateur
Espirito Santo Trophy (representing Australia): 2008, 2010
Tasman Cup (representing Australia): 2007
Queen Sirikit Cup (representing Australia): 2009

References

External links

Julia Boland at Golf Australia (archived)

Australian female golfers
Texas A&M Aggies women's golfers
ALPG Tour golfers
LPGA Tour golfers
University of Sydney alumni
Sportswomen from New South Wales
People from Tamworth, New South Wales
1985 births
Living people
21st-century Australian women